Sophie Stuckey (born 1 March 1991) is an English actress.

Biography and career
Sophie Stuckey was born in London, in the borough of Camden, on 1 March 1991. Her first role as an actress was in 2002, at the age of 11, in the film Close Your Eyes, while the following year she was in I Capture the Castle, film adaptation of Dodie Smith's book of the same name. Afterwards, she was in The Dark in 2005 and in My Life in Ruins (aka Driving Aphrodite) in 2009.

Meanwhile, in 2004 she debuted on TV in the BBC film Who Cares?, written and directed by Ray Harrison Graham and produced by RedBird Productions; in 2006 she appeared in one episode of the ninth season of Midsomer Murders, playing Dora Southerly, a girl who finds the body of a man in an old sawmill.

In 2010, she got the role of Summer Farley, leading of the TV series Summer in Transylvania, which pushed her to quit her studies in Global Politics and International Relations at Birkbeck, and took part in The Woman in Black with Daniel Radcliffe, coming out in 2012: in the film she was Stella Kipps, late wife of the leading, who appeared only in flashbacks or as a ghost. The next year she joined the cast of the two-part miniseries The Reckoning, in which she played the part of cancer-stricken fifteen-year-old Amanda Wilson.

In 2012 she took part, as Jemma, in Menhaj Huda's horror film Comedown, which was screened as world premiere on 4 October 2012 at Grimmfest. In January 2013 she was in two episodes of the sixteenth season of the TV series Silent Witness, playing Karen Masters, while in April she was in Endeavour. In September she was Eva Harper in the fourth episode of the third season of Vera.

Filmography

Film

Television

References

External links 
 
 Sophie Stuckey on United Agents

1991 births
Actresses from London
English film actresses
English television actresses
Living people
People from Camden Town